Polivanov is a Russian surname. Notable people with the surname include:

Alexei Polivanov (1855–1920) Russian military general
Mikhail Polivanov (1930–1992) Russian theoretical physicist
Yevgeny Polivanov (1891–1938) Russian linguist, Orientalist and polyglot

Russian-language surnames